Puerto Aysén is a city of Chile located in the Aysén del General Carlos Ibáñez del Campo Region,  above the head of Aisén Fjord in the country's extreme south. The main tourist attraction is Lagoon San Rafael.

Originally settled around 1914, it was officially recognized as a city on January 28, 1928. It numbers around 17,000 inhabitants.

Economy
Fisheries and tourism are the main economic activities. The port of Chacabuco serves passenger ferries but also cargo traffic: fuel and other necessities are imported while live cattle and other agricultural produce are exported. The city is surrounded by several power plants, both hydro- and thermal powered.

Climate
Puerto Aysén has an oceanic climate (Köppen climate classification: Cfb) with high rainfall throughout the year (and one of Chile's wettest places). Typical of oceanic climates, precipitation peaks in late fall and early winter.

References

External links
Aysen Municipal Government

Capitals of Chilean provinces
Populated places established in 1914
Populated places in Aysén Province